Many toponyms ("place names") contain the name of Odin (Norse Óðinn, Old English Wōden, proto-Germanic Wōdanaz).

Scandinavia, Nordic and Baltic countries

Denmark
Odense
Onsberg – formally Othensberg, "Odin's Berg".
Onsbjerg
Onsholt – "Odin's Holt", located in Viby, Jutland. A marked hill now covered in corn fields that was, up until about the 18th century, covered in wetlands on all sides. It was covered by a wood (a "holt") during the Viking Age. Viby may mean "the settlement by the sacred site" and contains traces of sacrifices going back 2,500 years.
Onsild
Onsved
Othinshille
Vojens – from "Odin's Temple".

Estonia
 Island of Osmussaar – "Odensholm" in Swedish, literally "Odin's islet".

Finland
Island of Odensö  – also known as Udensö, literally "Odin's island". Probably a medieval transformation of an original Finnic name unrelated to Odin.

Norway
Óðinsøy ("Odin's island").

Sweden
Odensbacken – Odin's Slope
Odensberg, Schonen – "Odin's Berg".
Odensvi – Odin's Sanctuary, a place name appearing in Västmanland, Närke & Småland.
Odinslund, modern toponym
Onsjö, Odensjö & Odensjön – Odin Lake/The Odin Lake, several places in southern Sweden
Onslunda – Odin's GroveOdenplan – "Odin's Square" in Stockholm.
Odengatan – "Odin Street"; running past Odenplan up to Valhallavägen "Valhalla Way" in Stockholm), modern toponyms
Odensåker, Skaraborg – Odin's Field
Odenssala  Odin's Hall or Odin's Sala, originally Odhins Harg meaning Odin's Shrine

Mainland Europe

France
Northern France around Audresselles (Oderzell) district of Marquise:
Audinghen –

Germany
Bad Godesberg – originally spelt Wuodenesberg, which is "Wotan's mountain".
Gudensberg – originally spelt Wodenesberg which means the same as above.
Godensholt – formerly Wodensholt, Wotan's wood.
Wodensweg.

Netherlands
Woensdrecht.
Woensel
Wânswert

UK

England
Odin Mine, Castleton, Derbyshire
Odin Sitch, Castleton, Derbyshire
Wambrook, Somerset – "Woden's Brook".
Wampool, Hampshire – "Woden's Pool".
Wanborough, Wiltshire – from Wôdnes-beorg, "Woden's Barrow".
Wanborough, Surrey.
Wansdyke – "Woden's dyke, embankment".
Wanstead, Essex – "Woden's Stead".
Wednesbury – "Woden's burgh".
 Woden Road in Wednesbury.
Wednesfield – "Woden's field".
Wednesham, Cheshire – "Woden's Ham".
Wensley – "Woden's meadow".
Wembury, Devon – "Woden's Hill/Barrow" from the Old English "Wódnesbeorh".
Woden's Barrow – also Christianized as Adam's Grave or Walker's Hill, a barrow in Wiltshire. The Old English spelling was  "Wodnes-beorh".
Woden Hill, Hampshire – a hill in Bagshot Heath.
A valley which the West Overton–Alton road runs through was called Wodnes-denu which means "Woden's Valley".
Wonston, Hampshire – "Woden's Town".
Woodbridge, Suffolk – Wodenbrycge ("Woden's Bridge").
Woodnesborough- also translates as "Woden's burgh", the centre of the town was known as "Woden's hill".
Woodway House – from the house on Woden's Way.
Wormshill – also derived from "Woden's hill".
Grimsdyke – from "Grim", which means both "hooded" and "fierce", another name used for Woden.
Grim's Ditch – a 5–6 mile section on the Berkshire Downs, the chalk escarpment above the Oxfordshire villages of Ardington, Hendred and Chilton.
Grim's Ditch (Harrow) – also known as Grimsdyke. A section of Anglo-Saxon era trenches in Harrow. Frederick Goodall's house Grim's Dyke and a local school are named after the area.
 Grim's Ditch (Hampshire) – another set of earthworks.
Grim's Ditch (South Oxfordshire) – Iron Age/early Roman era earthworks in Oxfordshire.
Grimes Graves
Grimsbury, Oxfordshire.
Grimsbury Castle, Berkshire – hillfort occupied at least between the 3rd and 2nd Centuries B.C. Named after Woden by the Saxons.
Grimley, Worcestershire – from the Old English "Grimanleage", which means "the wood or clearing of Grim (Woden)"  
Grimspound – an Iron Age settlement on Dartmoor.
Grimscote – a village in Northamptonshire, "Grim's Cott"
Grimsthorpe – a village in Lincolnshire, "Grim's Thorpe"
Roseberry Topping – Óðins bjarg ("Odin's rock or crag", plus "topping" added later).
The ford on the River Irwell which Regent's Bridge, Ordsall, now crosses, was traditionally called "Woden's Ford" and a nearby cave (no longer extant) was known as "Woden's Den".

Scotland
 Edin's Hall Broch, Berwickshire, sometimes Odin's Hall Broch and originally Wooden's (Woden's) Hall 
Grim's Dyke – another term used for the Antonine Wall
Woden Law – "Woden Hill", an Iron Age hillfort in the Cheviots very close to the border with Northumberland.

New World

Australia
Woden Valley, a district of Canberra.

Canada
Mount Odin, on Baffin Island Nunavut.

United States
Odin, Illinois
Odin, Minnesota
Odin, Pennsylvania, in Potter County, PA.
Woden, Iowa
Woden, Texas, an unincorporated community in Nacogdoches County.

See also
Toponymy
Theophoric name
Wednesday
Names of Odin

Notes

References

Place names
Odin
Odin
Placenames